Feel Me is the sixth album by the funk band Cameo, released in 1980.

Track listing
All tracks composed by Anthony Lockett and Larry Blackmon; except where indicated
"Throw It Down" - 5:44
"Your Love Takes Me Out" - 6:39 	
"Keep It Hot" - 4:42  
"Feel Me" - 5:56  
"Is This the Way" - 5:58
"Roller Skates" - (Aaron Mills, Nathan Leftenant, Larry Blackmon) 4:40
"Better Days" - 4:12

Personnel
Larry Blackmon - lead vocals, drums, percussion
 Gregory Johnson - keyboards,  vocals
Aaron Mills - bass guitar, vocals
Thomas 'T.C.' Campbell - keyboards
Anthony Lockett - guitar, vocals
Eric Durham  - guitar
Arnett Leftenant - saxophone
Nathan Leftenant, Arthur Young - trumpet
Jeryl Bright - trombone, vocals
Randy Stern - keyboards
Jose Rossy - percussion
Randy Brecker, Lou Marini, Jon Faddis, Sefra Herman, Bob Mintzer, Dennis Morouse, Jim Pugh, David Taylor - horns
Tomi Jenkins, Steve Moore - vocals

Charts

Weekly charts

Year-end charts

Singles

References

External links
 Cameo-Feel Me at Discogs

Cameo (band) albums
1980 albums